Il Corral was a venue located in Los Angeles, California. that provided performance space for underground artists. It was founded by Bob Bellerue and Stane Hubert in January 2005.  Bellerue ceased involvement in September 2006; Hubert and Christie Scott continued the venture until December 2007.

Il Corral provided for music and film festivals:  The Turn the Screws Fest, Noisepollination, Harsh Noise v. Metal, Druid Underground Film Festival, Aloud Fest, Salient Lock-Up, The Curse of El Topo, Bent, Hollywood Nihilist Comedy Spectacular and Thee Dung Mummy; benefit shows for the Los Angeles Eco-Village, Kill-Radio and Tarantula Hill; and workshops for circuit bending and puppetry.  It was a centre for L.A. director Sean Carnage's weekly Monday night event.  Carnage's "Monday nights" were documented in the movie 40 Bands 80 Minutes!, filmed entirely inside the Il Corral; in March 2007, after approximately 50 shows, Sean Carnage moved his Monday night events to Pehrspace.

In addition to live recordings for CD and DVD, Il Corral hosted studio recordings for Amplified Piano Duets by Bob Bellerue & Jarrett Silberman, Snow White In Hell by KILT, Scavenger's Feast by Hive Mind, and also Corral Comp 05 for artists who had performed in the venue during 2005. Il Corral provided 215 live shows from January, 2006 until its closure in December 2007. It also served as a Bookshop and Record Store, selling cheap books on eclecticism, and music movies from the venue’s performers.

Scott and Hubert opened a similar venue, Zero-Point, south of downtown L.A.; Bellerue left Los Angeles for Brooklyn curating numerous shows around NYC and most notably the Ende Tymes Fest since 2011.

In October 2009, Il Corral was featured in Paper Cuts, a web site magazine produced by music label papercutsrecords.com.

Bands that played at Il Corral 

 Bastard Noise
 Bipolar Bear
 Books on Tape
 Captain Ahab
 Foot Village
 The Haters
 Health
 High Places
 Jessica Rylan
 John Wiese
 Kraig Grady
 Metalux
 Nels Cline
 Raven Chacon
 The Tuna Helpers
 Thomas Dimuzio
 Wolf Eyes

References

External links 
 Il Corral's website
 Zero-Point's website

Music venues in Los Angeles
Theatres in Los Angeles
Social centres in the United States
Music venues completed in 2005
Theatres completed in 2005
2005 establishments in California
2007 disestablishments in California